The Other Side is the debut studio album by Bulgarian-born German recording artist Lucy Diakovska, released by Edel Records and Schmanky Records under her pseudonym Lucy Licious on 5 September 2005 in German-speaking Europe. Primarily produced by Diakovska and Stephen Ullmann, it debuted and peaked at number 84 on the German Albums Chart.

Track listing

Charts

Release history

References

2005 debut albums